Granulosa cell tumours are tumours that arise from granulosa cells. They are estrogen secreting tumours and present as large, complex, ovarian masses. These tumours are part of the sex cord-gonadal stromal tumour or non-epithelial group of tumours.  Although granulosa cells normally occur only in the ovary, granulosa cell tumours occur in both ovaries and testicles (see ovarian cancer and testicular cancer). These tumours should be considered malignant and treated in the same way as other malignant tumours of ovary. The ovarian disease has two forms, juvenile and adult, both characterized by indolent growth, and therefore has high recovery rates.  The staging system for these tumours is the same as for epithelial tumours and most present as stage I. The peak age at which they occur is 50–55 years, but they may occur at any age.

Juvenile granulosa cell tumour is a similar but distinct rare tumour.  It too occurs in both the ovary and testis.  In the testis it is extremely rare, and has not been reported to be malignant.  Although this tumour usually occurs in children (hence its name), it has been reported in adults.

Presentation

Estrogens are produced by functioning tumours, and the clinical presentation depends on the patient's age and sex.
 Female
 If the patient is postmenopausal, she usually presents with abnormal uterine bleeding, and in some cases hemoperitoneum.
 If the patient is of reproductive age, she would present with menometrorrhagia. However, in some cases she may stop ovulating altogether.
 If the patient has not undergone puberty, early onset of puberty may be seen.
 these tumours tend to have late recurrences (even after 30 years)

Genetics

Adult granulosa cell tumours

Using next generation DNA sequencing, 97% of adult granulosa cell tumours were found to contain an identical mutation in the FOXL2 gene . This is a somatic mutation, meaning it is not usually transmitted to descendants. Mutation c.402C>G in the sequence of FOXL2 leads to the amino acid substitution p. C134W.  It is believed that this mutation may be the cause of granulosa cell tumours.

Juvenile granulosa cell tumours
Two recent studies show that the enzyme AKT1 is involved in juvenile granulosa cell tumours. In-frame duplications in the pleckstrin-homology domain of the protein were found in more than 60% of juvenile granulosa cell tumours occurring in girls under 15 years of age. The tumours without duplications carried point mutations affecting highly conserved residues. The mutated proteins carrying the duplications displayed a non-wild-type subcellular distribution, with a marked enrichment at the plasma membrane, leading to a strong activation of AKT1. Analysis by RNA-Seq pinpointed a series of differentially expressed genes that are involved in cytokine and hormone signaling and cell division-related processes. Further analyses pointed to a possible dedifferentiation process, and suggested that most of the transcriptomic dysregulations might be mediated by a limited set of transcription factors perturbed by AKT1 activation. These results incriminate somatic mutations of AKT1 as probable driver events in the pathogenesis of juvenile granulosa cell tumours.

Diagnosis

Gross appearance
Tumours vary in size, from tiny spots to large masses, with an average of 10 cm in diameter. Tumours are oval and soft in consistency.
On cut-section, histology reveals reticular, trabecular areas with interstitial haemorrhage and Call–Exner bodies-small cyst like spaces interspersed within a Graafian follicle.

Tumour marker
Inhibin, a hormone, has been used as biomarker for granulosa cell tumours.

In animals
In the ovaries of aging squirrel monkeys (Saimiri sciureus), clusters of granulosa cells occur that resemble granulosa cell tumours in humans.  These appear to be a normal change with age in this species.

See also
 Inhibin, alpha

References

External links 

Gynaecological cancer
Male genital neoplasia
Andrology
Rare cancers
Pediatric cancers